Degtyarka is a rural locality (a selo) and the administrative center of Degtyarsky Selsoviet of Nemetsky National District, Altai Krai, Russia. The population was 1,303 as of 2016. There are 7 streets.

Geography 
Degtyarka is located within the Kulunda Plain, 40 km northeast of Galbshtadt (the district's administrative centre) by road. Polevoye is the nearest rural locality.

Ethnicity 
The village is inhabited by Russians, Germans and others.

References 

Rural localities in Nemetsky National District